Lars Castellucci (born 24 February 1974) is a German politician of the Social Democratic Party of Germany (SPD) who has been serving as a member of the German Bundestag since 2013.

Early life and career
Castellucci studied political sciences, medieval and modern history and public law at the Universities of Heidelberg, Mannheim and at the San Francisco State University (SFSU) of California from 1995 to 2000, graduating with Magister Artium. He obtained doctorate (Dr. phil.) at the Technische Universität Darmstadt in 2008. His dissertation explored possible courses of action for the labor market policy facing social outlawing in Germany.

Castellucci worked as project leader for community and regional development and public participation at IFOK GmbH from 2001 to 2013. He is Professor of sustainable management, with a focus on integration and diversity management, at the University of Applied Management Studies (HdWM) in Mannheim since April 2013.

Political career
Castellucci joined the Social Democratic Party of Germany (SPD) in 1991. From 1995 to 2001 he was chairman of the Wiesloch local branch of the SPD and was elected member of the municipal council in Wiesloch in 1999. In 2001 he became chairman of the SPD group on Wiesloch municipal council.

Castellucci also filled the position of chairman of the Rhein-Neckar county branch of the SPD from 2001 to 2009. He was elected deputy chairman of the Baden-Württemberg branch of the SPD in 2005.

Member of the Bundestag, 2013-present
On 22 September 2013, Castellucci was first elected Member of the German Bundestag. From 2013 to 2021, he was a member of Committee on Internal Affairs and member of Committee on the Affairs of the European Union, where he served as his parliamentary group’s rapporteur on asylum and migration. He was also deputy chairman of the Parliamentary Advisory Council on Sustainable Development and chairman of the German-Italian Parliamentary Friendship Group. Since 2021, he has been serving on the Committee on Economic Cooperation and Development. In 2022 he was elected deputy chairman of the Committee of Internal Affairs and Community.

Since 2014, Castelucci has also been serving on the Advisory Committee on Sinti and Roma at the Federal Ministry of the Interior.

In 2018, Castellucci campaigned to succeed Leni Breymaier as chair of the SPD in Baden-Württemberg; he eventually lost against his competitor Andreas Stoch.

Other activities
 World Vision Germany, Member of the Board of Trustees (since 2020)
 Evangelical Church in Germany (EKD), Member of the Committee on Migration and Integration (since 2016) 
 Foundation "Remembrance, Responsibility and Future", Alternate Member of the Board of Trustees (since 2014)
 Bündnis für Demokratie und Toleranz, Member of the Advisory Board
 Education and Science Workers' Union (GEW), Member
 Friends of Nature, Member

Personal life
Castellucci lives with his partner in Heidelberg.

References

Living people
1974 births
Members of the Bundestag for Baden-Württemberg
Members of the Bundestag 2021–2025
Members of the Bundestag 2017–2021
Members of the Bundestag 2013–2017
Politicians from Heidelberg
San Francisco State University alumni
Members of the Bundestag for the Social Democratic Party of Germany
LGBT members of the Bundestag
Gay politicians